Arkong Bato is one of the constituent barangays in the city of Valenzuela, Metro Manila, Philippines.

Arkong Bato is a historical barangay named after the famous stone arch landmark on Marcelo H. Del Pilar Street that demarcates its boundary with Barangays Panghulo and Santolan in Malabon. The notable stone arch was built by the Americans in 1910, originally as a boundary marker between Rizal and Bulacan provinces, which Malabon and Valenzuela were once part of, respectively.

Festivals
Residents celebrate the Sta. Cruz fiesta every 3rd Sunday of May.

Landmarks
Some of the landmarks of the barangay include the Arkong Bato Chapel and the statue of Delfin Belilia Navarese at Navarette Street.

References

External links
Valenzuela, Philippines official site

Barangays of Metro Manila
Valenzuela, Metro Manila